Kassegaran Madrasa is a historical madrasa in Isfahan, Iran. It belongs to the era of the Safavid King Suleiman. According to the thuluth inscription above its portal, it was built in 1694 by the order and under supervision of Amir Mohammad Mehdi Hakimolmolk Ardestani.

References 

Buildings and structures completed in 1694
School buildings completed in the 17th century
Buildings and structures in Isfahan
1694 establishments in Iran